Santino Quinto Rice (born 20 August 1974) is an American fashion designer and television personality. He is best known for his appearances on the reality television programs Project Runway, RuPaul's Drag Race and On the Road with Austin and Santino.

Early life and education 
Santino Rice attended classes at the Fashion Institute of Design and Merchandising in Los Angeles. Rice worked under Pegah Anvarian and Tony Duquette, prior to his involvement with the television series Project Runway.

Career

In 2005, Santino participated as a contestant on the second season of the Bravo reality show Project Runway, producing mixed results on the show. He won two challenges and was among the top three designs three more times. However, Rice was among the bottom two scores for four challenges. Ultimately, he lasted throughout the season and was one of three finalists selected to show at Olympus Fashion Week in New York City. He finished in third place, behind Daniel Vosovic and Chloe Dao.

Rice became well known for the charismatic and sometimes abrasive persona that he presented on Project Runway, and he was often cited as the "villain" of the show. He was also known for his humor, including his impersonations of mentor Tim Gunn.

After Project Runway, Rice was selected to be one of the judges of the Miss Universe 2006 pageant. He was also asked by MTV VJ SuChin Pak to design her dress for the 2006 MTV Movie Awards. The following year, Rice made a guest appearance in the sixth episode of America's Most Smartest Model, in which he taught the contestants about fashion design. As of 2008, he was creating a new cigarette pack design for Camel, dressing a handful of elite private clients, and working on building his own clothing company.

More recently, Rice has been cast in two main roles in reality television. From 2009 to 2014, he was a judge on the Logo reality program RuPaul's Drag Race. Rice also starred in the Lifetime show On the Road with Austin and Santino, alongside fellow Project Runway alumnus Austin Scarlett. The show premiered in 2010, following Rice and Scarlett as they visited various American small towns, designing clothing for women who have upcoming special occasions. Rice also played a minor role as a homeless man in the 2010 independent queer cinema thriller L.A. Zombie.

Personal life
Rice has been referred to in the press as bisexual, but has said of his own sexual orientation, "You can just call me gay but I like men and I am attracted to beautiful women. I didn't like the negativity that was attached to being gay growing up so that is why I have problems with the label."

He has posted untrue claims about the COVID-19 virus and vaccines on Twitter. Rice has falsely asserted that COVID-19 is a "man-made virus designed by European and American scientists" and that "what they are selling people isn't even a vaccine." He also tweeted that "there is really no difference between injecting disinfectant or injecting a random vaccine" and that "the virus was designed to kill and its 'v@ccine' is equally deadly." COVID-19 vaccines are not known to cause severe illness, hospitalization, or death.

References

External links 

 Santino Rice on Twitter
 Santino Rice on Instagram

1974 births
Living people
American fashion designers
American gay artists
LGBT fashion designers
LGBT people from Missouri
Project Runway (American series) participants
Judges in American reality television series